The London City School District is a public school district in Madison County, Ohio, United States, serving the city of London.

Schools
 London Elementary School
 London High School
 London Middle School

External links
 https://www.london.k12.oh.us/

School districts in Ohio
Education in Madison County, Ohio
London, Ohio